Ten on Every Finger (German: An jedem Finger zehn) is a 1954 West German musical comedy film directed by Erik Ode and starring Germaine Damar, Erich Auer and Loni Heuser. It was shot at the Spandau Studios in West Berlin and on location around the city. The film's sets were designed by the art directors Hans Kuhnert and Theo Zwierski. A musical revue film, it features many top entertainers of the era. It marked the penultimate screen appearance of American performer Josephine Baker.

Cast
 Germaine Damar as Margit Rameau
 Erich Auer as 	Bert Martin
 Loni Heuser as 	Loni
 Walter Giller as 	Fips Kluger
 Bibi Johns as Biggy Nilsson
 Walter Gross as 	Kontrabassist Franz Hempel
 Werner Fuetterer as 	Gregor Bruchsal
 Detlev Lais as Self
 Kenneth Spencer as 	Okay
 Hubert von Meyerinck as 	Direktor des Lido
 Werner Kroll as 	Pensionswirt Kroll
 Cornelia Froboess as 	Cornelia
 Hans Albers as 	Self
 Mona Baptiste as Self
 Macky Kaspar as Trompeter Macky
 Josephine Baker as 	Josephine Baker
 Isa Günther as 	Frau im Publikum
 Jutta Günther as 	Frau im Publikum
 Ruth Stephan as Hans Albers' Sketchpartnerin
 Dina Gralla as 	Garderobiere Emma
 Claus Christofolini as	Tänzer
 Helmut Zacharias as Self
 Rudolf Schock as 	Self
 William Webster Bailey as 	Mad Bishop
 Franz-Otto Krüger as 	Postbeamter
 Sunshine Quartett as 	Self
 Das Cornell-Trio a Self

References

Bibliography
Bock, Hans-Michael and Bergfelder, Tim. The Concise Cinegraph: An Encyclopedia of German Cinema. Berghahn Books, 2009.
 Lowe, Denise. An Encyclopedic Dictionary of Women in Early American Films: 1895-1930.

External links 
 

1954 films
1954 comedy films
German comedy films
West German films
1950s German-language films
Films directed by Erik Ode
Films shot at Spandau Studios
1950s German films

de:An jedem Finger zehn